Peter Evans (1927–1985) was a breakfast radio announcer on the Australian Broadcasting Commission's station 3LO (now 774 ABC Melbourne). Prior to this, he had been a broadcaster at Melbourne commercial radio station 3XY. His ABC program ran for over two decades from 1965 until 1985 and for much of that period was the highest rating breakfast radio program in Melbourne. The radio show was also relayed and aired through ABC Radio in Brisbane Queensland.

Evans had a reputation for being eccentric and for sounding like "a bitter and grumpy man who was living in the past and had more interest in the British Empire of old than the country he had lived in for most of his life."

He repeatedly broke traditional broadcasting guidelines by such acts as allowing periods of several seconds of silence to be broadcast.

Coming from a Welsh background and having the common name for that background of Evans, he frequently referred to himself in the traditional Welsh form of "Evans the Wireless", whereby a person's occupation was used as part of their identifier.

The breakfast show was introduced by a fast-paced and witty instrumental tune called "Gentleman Jim", which was composed and conducted by Bert Kaempfert & his Orchestra, released in 1963. At the closing of the breakfast show Evans would again play "Gentleman Jim" as the show's theme, but usually he made a few satirical comments enticing the radio audience to tune in again tomorrow.

References

External links 
 Photo

Radio personalities from Melbourne
1985 deaths
1927 births